Map Room may refer to:

 A room for storing a large map collection
 Map Room (White House), a ground floor sitting room that once served as a situation room during World War II
 One of the rooms of the Churchill War Rooms, a hub of the war effort in World War II
 The Map Room of The British Museum, which later became the Map Library